An estimated 1,500 nurses from a number of countries lost their lives during World War I. Some died from disease or accidents, and some from enemy action.

Australia 

29 Australian nurses died from disease or injuries; 25 of these died on active service, and 4 died in Australia from injuries or illness sustained during their service. Most of these nurses were serving in the Australian Army Nursing Service; however, a small number were serving with Queen Alexandra's Imperial Military Nursing Service, one of a number of British Army nursing services during World War I. Other Australian women made their own way to Europe and joined the British Red Cross, private hospitals or other allied services.

Nurses serving with the Australian Army Nursing Service

Nurses serving with Queen Alexandra's Imperial Military Nursing Service Reserve

Volunteers serving with the Australian Red Cross

Canada 

53 Canadian nurses lost their lives during the war. In one incident, on 27 June 1918, 14 nurses were killed when their hospital ship HMHS Llandovery Castle was torpedoed while travelling from Halifax, Nova Scotia, to Liverpool, England. The nurses who died were:

Netherlands 
Rosa Vecht (18 July 1881 – 23 January 1915) died when she was injured by shrapnel at Veurne in West Flanders, while saying goodbye before a planned evacuation. She died after an operation to amputate her leg.

New Zealand 

16 New Zealand nurses died during the war, including 10 who died in the sinking of the hospital ship SS Marquette.

Romania 
Ecaterina Teodoroiu was a Romanian nurse who enlisted as a soldier and died on 3 September 1917 during active service.

United Kingdom

Most nurses were part of the Queen Alexandra's Imperial Military Nursing Service (QAIMNS). At the start of the war there less than 300 nurses, four years later when the war ended it had over 10,000 nurses in its ranks. According to the British Red Cross, "128 nursing members, 11 general service members and six Joint War Committee hospital members were killed."

Edith Cavell
Edith Cavell was executed for treason by a German firing squad on 12 October 1915 in Brussels, Belgium.

In March 1915, four Scottish nurses died in Serbia of typhus. They were part of a group of Scottish women – nurses, doctors and volunteers – who had travelled to Serbia to establish Scottish Women's Hospitals for Foreign Service:
 Margaret Neill Fraser
 Louisa Jordan
 Augusta Minshull
 Bessie Sutherland

Marjory Eva May Edwards served for three and a half years in Britain and France and died of measles in England on 4 January 1918. Her name is listed on the village war memorial at St Mary's Church at Streatley, Berkshire.

Catherine Miller was working at the 1st Western General Hospital in Liverpool, England when she died on 24 December 1918. She had contracted malaria while serving in Russia.

HMT Osmanieh sinking, 1917

On 31 December 1917, the British troop ship HMS Osmanieh (1906) struck a mine near the entrance to Alexandria Harbour. The ship sank in under 10 minutes and almost 200 service personnel died. Among the dead were eight nurses. Two of them belonged to the Queen Alexandria’s Imperial Military Nursing Service (QAIMNS):

 Nellie Hawley 
 Dorothea Roberts

and the rest belonged to the Voluntary Aid Detachment (VAD):

 Gertrude Bytheway
 Una Duncanson
 Lilian Midwood
 Hermione Rogers
 Catherine Ball 
 Winifred Brown

United States 
Nurses Clara Ayres and Helen Burnett Wood were the first two women to be killed while part of the United States military when they died on 17 May 1917, following an accident on board USS Mongolia.

Helen Fairchild died in France on 18 January 1918, from post-operative complications following surgery for an ulcer.

Lucy Nettie Fletcher (1886-1918) was the first Red Cross nurse in General Pershing's army to die in the performance of duty.

References

Nurses
Killed